Above the Law may refer to:

Movies and television
 Above the Law (1988 film), an American action film starring Steven Seagal
 Above the Law (2017 film), a Belgian-French thriller film starring Lubna Azabal 
 Above the Law (TV series), an Australian television series
 Righting Wrongs, a 1986 Hong Kong film titled Above the Law for international release

Legal concepts
 Immunity
 Impeachment
 , doctrine of Roman Law as coined by Ulpian: "The sovereign is not bound by the laws."

Other uses
 Above the Law (group), an American hip hop group
 Above the Law (website), a law blog
 "Above the Law", a song by Bad Meets Evil from Hell: The Sequel
 "Above the Law", the third episode of the adventure video game The Walking Dead: A New Frontier

See also
 Beyond the Law (disambiguation)
 Outside the Law (disambiguation)